Anuak may refer to:
Anuak people, East Africa
Anuak language, spoken primarily in the Western part of Ethiopia
Anuak Zone,  Ethiopian region of Gambela